The Royal Court Theatre is a theatre located at 1 Roe Street in Liverpool, England. The current Royal Court Theatre was opened on 17 October 1938, after fire destroyed its predecessor. It was rebuilt in Art Deco style and soon became Liverpool's premier theatre. The interior of the building has a nautical theme, in line with Liverpool's seafaring traditions. The design of the basement lounge is based on the Cunard liner Queen Mary. There are three viewing levels within the main auditorium: the Stalls, the Grand Circle and the Balcony.

Although the Liverpool Blitz during the Second World War destroyed many of the buildings around it, the Royal Court itself remained intact. Throughout the war, many well-known artists performed here, including Ivor Novello, Margot Fonteyn and John Gielgud. Richard Burton made his stage debut here and Judi Dench made her professional stage debut in September 1957.

In the 1980s it became home to rock and pop concerts, hosting artists such as The Smiths, Slade, Kraftwerk, Tangerine Dream, Rage Against the Machine, R.E.M., Iron Maiden, David Bowie, Ozzy Osbourne, Roger Taylor, Brian May, U2 and George Michael.

In 1990, the building was listed as Grade II, highlighting the fact that it is a major part of Liverpool's heritage.

In 2005 Rawhide Comedy Club took ownership of the building. Following two years of stand-up comedy, with a break in 2006 to produce Brick Up The Mersey Tunnels, they began producing plays all year round in 2007. The theatre has produced more than 100 shows since 2007, including Council Depot Blues, The Royal, Mam! I'm 'Ere and a sell out series of Christmas shows including: Scouse Pacific, Little Scouse On The Prairie, The Hitchhiker's Guide To Fazakerley, The Scouse Nativity, The Scouse Cinderella and The Scouse Snow White

History

The site of the Royal Court Theatre was originally that of a water well constructed in the 12th century. A circus owner, John Cooke, bought the site in 1826 for his circuses, plays, operas and concerts, and it became known as 'Cooke's Royal Amphitheatre of Arts'. During this time Pablo Fanque, the black circus performer and proprietor immortalised in the Beatles' song "Being for the Benefit of Mr. Kite!", performed here as a part of William Batty's circus. In 1881, the building was redesigned by Henry Sumner as a regular theatre and it was re-opened as the Royal Court.

In 1896 the theatre was taken over by Robert Arthur of Glasgow, who in 1897 put all his theatres into a limited company quoted on the Stock Exchanges, the Robert Arthur Theatres Ltd. In 1912, following Arthur's bankruptcy, the shareholders appointed as chairman Michael Simons of the Theatre Royal, Glasgow, chairman and creator in 1895 of Howard & Wyndham Ltd. The direction and programming of the theatre, embracing plays, musicals, revues, opera and pantomime, now passed to Howard & Wyndham Ltd, chaired by Simons with its managing director Fred Wyndham, who would be followed in 1928 by A. Stewart Cruikshank after his King's Theatre, Edinburgh had joined the Howard & Wyndham group.

A fire destroyed the building in 1933. Five years after demolition, construction works began in March 1938 to ensure the theatre was rebuilt and reopened in October of the same year. The title deeds of the theatre changed to Howard & Wyndham in 1941.

The current Royal Court Theatre was opened on 17 October 1938. It had been totally rebuilt in Art Deco style to the designs of architect James Bushell Hutchins; its splendor and grandeur made it Liverpool's number one theatre. The interior of the building has a nautical theme, in line with Liverpool's seafaring traditions. The design of the basement lounge is based on the Cunard liner Queen Mary, which had been launched on the Clyde two years before the 1938 reopening. There are three viewing levels within the main auditorium: the Stalls, the Grand Circle, and the Balcony.

Although the Liverpool Blitz during the Second World War destroyed many of the buildings around it, the Royal Court itself remained intact. Throughout the war, many well-known artists performed in the Royal Court, including Ivor Novello, Margot Fonteyn and John Gielgud. Richard Burton made his stage debut at the Royal Court in an Emlyn Williams production. The 22-year-old Judi Dench made her professional stage debut here in September 1957, playing Ophelia in an Old Vic production of Hamlet

In 1980, two former Liverpool taxi drivers took the Royal Court in a new direction, moving away from traditional plays and instead of transferring the focus to rock and pop concerts. Their first year ended promisingly and proved to be a successful strategy for the venue, which went on to play host to artists as internationally famous as Tangerine Dream, Rage Against the Machine, R.E.M., Iron Maiden, David Bowie, Ozzy Osbourne, Roger Taylor, Brian May, U2 and George Michael.

The music videos for "Let It Go", "High 'n' Dry (Saturday Night)", and "Bringin' On the Heartbreak" by the British rock band Def Leppard were directed by Doug Smith and shot on 22 July 1981. The photo on the "Let It Go" single cover was taken from that shoot.

In 1983, rock group Slade performed their last live UK concert with the original lineup featuring Noddy Holder.

In 1990, the building was listed as Grade II, highlighting the fact that it is a major part of Liverpool's heritage.

In 2005 Rawhide Comedy Club took ownership of the building. Following two years of stand-up comedy, with a break in 2006 to produce Brick Up The Mersey Tunnels, they began producing plays all year round in 2007.

Present

The stalls are now set out in a three-tier cabaret-style arrangement with tables and chairs and a bar at the rear of the stalls. The current capacity is 1,186 (Stalls 290 [cabaret,] Circle 403, Balcony 493).  Audience members can dine before the show in the stalls seating.

Following two years of being the home to the Rawhide Comedy Club, the Royal Court made a move back to producing theatre in the summer of 2007 with the sell-out re-run of Brick Up the Mersey Tunnels.

Since then, the theatre has undergone extensive refurbishment which completed its third 'Act' in summer 2017.

In 2010 the theatre began their sell out Variety Lunch Club series which provides lunch, a cup of tea, a singer, and a comedian for £6.  More than 1,200 people a month come to these Wednesday afternoon shows.

The theatre also offers free to access groups including a Community Choir and a Youth Theatre for young people aged 11 and up.

The theatre has produced shows such as Council Depot Blues, The Royal, Mam! I'm 'Ere and best-selling Christmas show The Scouse Nativity.

Liverpool's Royal Court became a National Portfolio Organisation and has been receiving Arts Council funding since April 2018. In 2018 it also launched Boisterous Theatre Company, Liverpool's only company dedicated to promoting BAME talent.

The theatre has produced more than 100 shows since 2007, including Council Depot Blues, The Royal, Mam! I'm 'Ere and a sell out series of Christmas shows including Scouse Pacific, Little Scouse On The Prairie, The Hitchhiker's Guide To Fazakerley, The Scouse Nativity, The Scouse Cinderella, and The Scouse Snow White. For a full list of shows see below.

Technical

Flying

The counterweight fly system has recently been refurbished. There were originally in excess of 70 fly lines, however, this has been reduced to about half that number in order to increase the distance between bars.

The original brakes have now been removed. They screwed shut and could hinge open to completely release the rope.

Lighting
The lighting was controlled by a 'Grandmaster' which was situated on a perch about 8 feet above the stage floor on Stage Right. This would have been operated by two people and was in operation until the 1980s. It was only disconnected from the power in June 2006.

The lighting is now controlled by a High End Systems Roadhog lighting desk and 3 Avolites Art 2000 48-way dimmers. It has an extensive lantern stock including ETC Source Four 750's, Strand Cantata Fresnels and Martin Mac 500's.

Rigging
FOH there is a 12 m A-type truss hung from 2 lodestar 1-ton motors. This is used for most of the FOH rigging. There are also truss booms either side of the stage, FOH.

Revolving Stage 
The refurbishment saw the restoration of the original revolving stage, the biggest outside of London.

Shows

Pantomime
With no televisions and no cinema, Liverpool audiences of the late 19th century flocked to the theatre. Liverpool possessed no less than 26 theatres and 38 music halls. The main theatres towards the end of the century were the Prince Of Wales in Clayton Square (opened 1861) the Shakespeare Theatre off London Road (opened 1866) and the Royal Court Theatre.

The site of the Royal Court had been a theatre for many years. As Cookes Royal Amphitheatre of Arts, up to 4,000 people would gather to attend plays, operas, concerts and circus. In 1881 as ownership of the theatre changed, it was rebuilt and renamed The Royal Court Theatre. Along with the three other theatres it presented an annual pantomime.

The Victorian pantomime was not only the template for today's show but very much a vehicle for music. The Poluski Brothers were among the stars who featured. Combining a mixture of music hall, comic opera and a large chunk of spectacle, the pantomime appealed to all levels of society. The first Royal Court pantomime, or "annual" as it was known, was Babes in the Wood. It is not clear whether this was a success or not, but no further pantomime was produced at the Court for fourteen years until 1895 with the presentation of Dick Whittington.

Three years later, Arthur Lawrence was appointed the theatre manager. Starting with Aladdin, it was Lawrence who put the Royal Court firmly in the centre of the panto map. The biggest music hall stars of the day would appear in the Court's "annual". George Robey, Harry Lauder, Little Hetty King as Aladdin Tich, the Three Sisters Levey, and the Poluski Brothers all helped to make the Royal Court's pantomime among the most famous in Britain. With the ownership of the theatre passing to Howard & Wyndhams Ltd at the turn of the century, the growth of pantomime blossomed.

Arthur Lawrence quoted in The Liverpudlian, November 1938:
In 1906, in Aladdin, I had Hetty King and [Happy Fanny Fields], together with Malcolm Scott and Harry Tate-some combination. I produced at the Court, in twenty-six years, twenty pantomimes. The 1906 panto was the biggest success. We averaged takings of just under £2,000 a week, and that in a theatre supposed to hold no more than about £275 at full capacity. Our pantomimes would run elsewhere for about five years, so Liverpool was thus a pantomime manufacturing centre. 'Happy' Fanny Fields, They were all made here—scenery, dresses, jokes and music, and all. I may mention, also, that we had a stage unsurpassed for its equipment. Every kind of trap ever known on a stage was in being.

That pantomime Aladdin was repeated, with almost the same cast, at the Adelphi Theatre in London the following year. "A chorus of over 100 Voices" boasted the posters. A magazine was produced in Liverpool solely devoted to pantomimes.

[Fanny Fields] in Aladdin By the 1920s the death of Music Hall was underway, and the Royal Court panto mirrored its decline. Hetty King Gone were the stars with their own personal songs to be replaced by "free" songs that anyone could sing. The Royal Court panto ended, replaced each Christmas by musical comedy, or a visit by the D’Oyly Carte Opera Company.

Upon re-opening some years after its fire in 1938, its first Panto was Humpty Dumpty, starring Gene Gerrard, Bobbie Comber, the Tiller Girls, and a cast "of Over 80". The consecutive run of pantomime was not to be, With another World War the Howard and Wyndham's—Babes in the Wood spectacle of pantomime found itself replaced with the comedy The Eric Maschwitz revue, featuring a young Charles Hawtrey (of later Carry On Fame) performing female impersonations. The following year Vivien Leigh appeared in The Doctor's Dilemma.

It was not until 1943, with the arrival of A. Stewart Cruickshank as managing director that pantomime returned, again starting with Babes In The Wood. By the 1960s television comedians and pop stars became the new stars of panto. In 1956, young heart throb Dickie Valentine took on the role of Aladdin. By the end of the fifties, facing stiff competition and dwindling audiences, the Royal Court Pantomime began a slow lingering death. In the Sixties occasional pantomimes (always Cinderella) were interspersed by Christmas shows by Ken Dodd, Dora Bryan, Frankie Vaughan, the Bachelors and the Black & White Minstrels.

Howard & Wyndham's financial problems increased, and the Royal Court was offered to the City Council to purchase. They refused. An attempt to open the Court as a Bingo Hall in 1968 was abandoned after eight months. There was no Christmas show after Aladdin in 1975. An attempt to revive panto in 1981 with Snow White was not successful, and pantomimes were no longer performed at the Royal Court.

In 1997 the Neptune Theatre in Liverpool presented Aladdin at the Court. Following on their success at the Neptune the previous year with Sonia in Dick Whittington, they presented Aladdin starring Julie Goodyear as Mrs. Twankey, and Danny McCall as Aladdin. Since then the Royal Court pantomimes have been Cinderella (1998), Babes in the Wood (1999), Aladdin (2000) and Dick Whittington (2001).

Pantomime returned to the Royal Court in (2006) with Snow White and the Seven Dwarfs starring Hollyoaks' Christina Bailey as Snow White.

Notable shows

Slappers and Slapheads
 2003 Performed at The Royal Court, Slappers and Slapheads, written by local Playwrights Len Pentin and Fred Lawless was performed with a mainly local cast and crew. Slappers and Slapheads is returning to the Royal Court in 2009 from Friday 6 February to Saturday 7 March with an all new cast.

Brick Up the Mersey Tunnels
 2006, 2007, 2008, 2009, 2011 & 2016
Brick Up the Mersey Tunnels a play with music written by Dave Kirby and Nicky Allt showed in the Royal Court from 3 August to 26 August 2006. This was a huge success and received 9/10 in a review in the Liverpool Echo.

Lennon
 Performed 2010 and 2013, Lennon is a play by Bob Eaton based on the life of John Lennon. In 2010 the lead role was played by Andrew Schofield, in 2013 by John Power. The musical premiered in 1981 at the Everyman Theatre, Liverpool and was shown Off-Broadway, New York in 1982. Its 1985 London Astoria Theatre production won the Sunday Times Award for Best Musical and two Olivier Award nominations.

You'll Never Walk Alone 
 2011, 2014, 2017 & 2020

The story of the Liverpool Football Club, written by Nicky Allt.

Stags and Hens
 2008 – Stags and Hens by Willy Russell

The Miracle of Great Homer Street 
 2018

Starring Les Dennis and Andrew Schofield, TMOGHS is written by Gerry Linford, winner of 'Highly Commended Award' by Liverpool Hope Playwriting Prize

Girls Don't Play Guitars 
 2019 & 2020

Musical that tells the story of The Liverbirds, an all-female beat group in the 1960s. The show attracted attention in the story of The Liverbirds and was featured in a short documentary by the New York Times.

Full list of shows

References

External links
Royal Court Liverpool website
What's On At The Royal Court Theatre, Liverpool
Brick up the Mersey Tunnels Review.
Liverpool Theatre History

Grade II listed buildings in Liverpool
Theatres in Liverpool
Tourist attractions in Liverpool
Music venues in Liverpool
Art Deco architecture in Liverpool
Concert halls in England
Music venues completed in 1938
Theatres completed in 1938